Nee Enthan Vaanam is a 2000 Indian Tamil-language thriller film directed by R. K. Suresh. The film stars Vignesh, Reshma and Charan Raj, with Vadivelu, Rocky, Telephone Satyanarayana, Bhaskar, Kumarimuthu and Omakuchi Narasimhan playing supporting roles. The film, produced by N. Babu Rao and V. Udaya Kumar, had musical score by Sangeetha Rajan and was released on 22 December 2000.

Plot

The film begins with three terrorists robbing an armoured government van full of cash, in the process, they kill the police officers in the vehicle. The police department is now looking for the three culprits, the police even set monetary reward offered to whoever catches the wanted criminals. Prakash (Rocky), the head of the terrorist group, has no choice but to take refuge in Pasumalai forest with his partners Siva and Guna. According to a reliable source, the police department under the orders of Sathya (Vignesh) and Alex Pandian (Charan Raj) set a camp in the forest. Sathya is an upright and calm sub-inspector while Alex Pandian is a disrespectful inspector. In Pasumalai forest, a small tribal group lives there and the tribe welcomes the police force with respect.

Thereafter, Sathya falls in love at first sight with the tribal girl Meenu (Reshma), Meenu eventually accepts his love. In the meantime, the tribal women are mysteriously killed one by one the night. Sathya first suspects Alex Pandian (Charan Raj) who has this irreverent attitude toward women. Prakash who prowls around in the forest has an eye on the tribal women. Afterwards, Sathya finds a treehouse in the middle of the forest and finds the killer's personal diary.

In the past, Dheepan (Bhaskar), the killer, was a happily married man but he had sexual problems. His wife Megha had an affair with his best friend. When Dheepan knew about their affair, he killed them both and was sentenced to life imprisonment. Dheepan then managed to escape from jail and he became a member of the tribe.

Dheepan next target is none other than Sathya's lover Meenu. The rest of the story is how Sathya and Alex Pandian arrest the three terrorists and the misogynist psychopath Deepan.

Cast

Vignesh as Sathya
Reshma as Meenu
Charan Raj as Alex Pandian
Vadivelu as Ottaiodasal
Rocky as Prakash
Telephone Satyanarayana as Tribal chief
Bhaskar as Dheepan/Rasaiah
Kumarimuthu
Omakuchi Narasimhan
Joker Thulasi
Muthukaalai
King Kong
Manoj
Sahadevan
Mahadevan
Rasheed Ummer as Arun/Rasaiah
Haribaba
Babuji
Sagar
Varsha as Vellaiamma
Deepika
Lakshmipriya
T. R. Srilekha
Bindhu

Soundtrack

The film score and the soundtrack were composed by Sangeetha Rajan. The soundtrack, released in 2000, features 6 tracks with lyrics written by Piraisoodan and Mayil.

References

2000 films
2000s Tamil-language films
Indian thriller films
Films set in forests
2000 directorial debut films
2000 thriller films